Olga Yakovlevna Ivanova (born 1945) is a career diplomat who was the Ambassador Extraordinary and Plenipotentiary of the Russian Federation to the Republic of Mauritius.

Ivanova graduated from the Moscow State Institute of International Relations in 1968, and worked in various diplomatic posts in the central offices of the USSR Ministry of Foreign Affairs and abroad. From 19921995 Ivanova worked in the Department of International Humanitarian and Cultural Cooperation of the Russian Ministry of Foreign Affairs, and from 19951999 was an adviser at the Permanent Mission of Russia to UNESCO in Paris, France.

In February 2004, Ivanova made history when she was appointed as Ambassador of Russia to Mauritius. Her posting to Mauritius was the first time in the history of the Ministry of Foreign Affairs that a woman was posted as an ambassador to a foreign nation.

Ivanova speaks Russian, English, and Arabic.

References 

Living people
Ambassadors of Russia to Mauritius
Moscow State Institute of International Relations alumni
1945 births
Russian women diplomats
Soviet women diplomats
Women ambassadors

it:Ol'ga Ivanova